1-Methylnaphthalene is an organic compound with the formula CH3C10H7. It is a colorless liquid. It is isomeric with 2-methylnaphthalene.

Reference fuel
1-Methylnaphthalene defines the lower (zero) reference point of cetane number, a measure of diesel fuel ignition quality, as it has a long ignition delay (poor ignition qualities). In contrast, cetane, with its short ignition delay, defines the upper reference point at 100. In testing, isocetane (2,2,4,4,6,8,8-heptamethylnonane or HMN) replaced 1-methylnaphthalene as the low cetane number reference fuel in 1962 for reasons of better oxidation stability and ease of use in the reference engine. The scale is unchanged, as isocetane's cetane number is measured at 15, referenced to 1-methylnaphthalene and cetane.

Methylnaphthalene anion
With alkali metals, 1-methylnaphthalene forms radical anion salts such as sodium 1-methylnaphthalene.

Compared to its structural analog sodium naphthalene, sodium 1-methylnaphthalene is more soluble, which is useful for low-temperature reductions.

See also
Naphthalene#Naphthalene in the interstellar medium

References

External links
PubChem Entry for 1-methylnaphthalene

1-Naphthyl compounds
Aromatic hydrocarbons